The Prittle Brook is a 7.2 mile (11.59 km) watercourse in south Essex, England. A tributary of the River Roach, the brook rises in Thundersley and passes through Hadleigh, Leigh-on-Sea, Westcliff,  Prittlewell, Rochford and discharges into the Roach and then into the North Sea via the Roach and Crouch estuaries.

Description

Course 
Prittle Brook rises in Thundersley near Kiln Road opposite Shipwrights Drive (51°33'38"N 0°35'40"E) it flows (partly culverted) north then east and under Rayleigh Road (A129). It emerges from a culvert near Prittle Close, and combines with another stream flowing from the north. Flowing eastwards, its course is through West Wood, then under private properties before crossing under Daws Heath Road. It then flows through private property again before reaching Dodds Grove Nature Reserve and then into Hadleigh Great Wood and Belfairs Wood. The brook formed a series of meanders to the north of Hadleigh Great Wood. These were 'tampered with after 1920 and most of the meanders cut off'.

A small tributary arises near The Crescent, Hadleigh and flows east under Woodfield Road, to the north of St. David’s Drive, then under Highlands  Boulevard and joins Prittle Brook to the rear of houses in Vardon Drive, Leigh-on-Sea (51°34'27"N 0°42'59"E). Another tributary arises in Hadleigh Great Wood and flows north east to join Prittle Brook at the boundary of the wood.

From Belfairs the brook flows east under Eastwood Road and broadly follows the alignment of  Manchester Drive and Fairfax Drive – known as the Prittle Brook Greenway – to Prittlewell Chase  Southend. From the eastern end of the Greenway the Prittle Brook flows under Victoria Avenue (A127), through Priory Park and north, past London Southend Airport to Rochford and eventually joins with an arm of the River Roach (Fleethall Creek) at Sutton Bridge (51°34'27"N 0°42'59"E). The normal tidal limit of the Roach is about 150 metres south of Sutton Bridge.

The Prittle Brook has a catchment area of 20.18 km2 (4,987 acres).

Prittle Brook Greenway 
A 5.7 km pathway (officially designated the "Prittle Brook Greenway" in 2010) enables walkers and cyclists to follow the section of the Brook from Belfairs, past Southend University Hospital to Roots Hall, effectively providing a route from Leigh into Southend which avoids the main roads. This pathway, built in the 1940s, follows the Prittle Brook as it passes under several roads; the bridge which leads to Our Lady of Lourdes School in Manchester Drive runs directly over the Brook. This part of the Brook's route has been urbanised since the 1930s, and the banks have been concreted east of the Belfairs Wood area. As a consequence, the velocity of the brook has greatly increased, a phenomenon particularly noticeable during and after heavy rain (see below).

The Prittle Brook Greenway was the subject of major improvement work between 2009 and 2012, during which the sections running parallel with Blenheim Chase and Prittlewell Chase were widened and signposted.

Flood defences 

In September 1968, during the Great flood of 1968, the Prittle Brook overflowed and flooded houses in Daws Heath Road, Hadleigh and around Manchester Drive, Leigh-on-Sea. The brook was subsequently culverted and provided with concrete embankments west of Daws Heath Road. In 1972–3 the Prittle Brook Flood Relief scheme was constructed. This takes excess water from the brook at times of flood from an inlet structure west of Eastwood Road (51°33'04"N 0°38'45"E. Elevation 33.5 metres AOD), Leigh-on-Sea and transfers water through an underground tunnel. Another intake to the tunnel is adjacent to Manchester Drive.The tunnel is 2.5 metres in diameter and is formed from segmented concrete blocks, it was constructed by Murphy using a rotary drum excavator. The tunnel discharges water into the River Thames at an outfall on the foreshore at Chalkwell beach.

The water level in the Prittle Brook is continuously monitored. The Prittlewell Brook [sic] Monitoring Station is located in Belfairs Park (51°33'10.9"N 0°38'28.0"E); it comprises a concrete flume and equipment  cabinet. The current water level is accessible online.

Note: Coordinate  is at Priory Park, Southend on Sea

References

External links
 Prittle Brook Greenway, Cycle Southend
 Prittle Brook Greenway Phase 1 nearing completion
The Prittle Brook Beyond the Point

Castle Point
Rivers of Essex
Southend-on-Sea (district)